Mariken van Nieumeghen is a 1974 Dutch drama film directed by Jos Stelling. It is based on the 16th-century text Mariken van Nieumeghen. It was entered into the 1975 Cannes Film Festival.

Cast
 Ronnie Montagne as Mariken
 Eric Bais as Gast in herberg
 Sander Bais as Moenen
 Kees Bakker as Bedelaar
 Jacqueline Bayer as Meisje
 Harm Begeman as Wagenspeler
 Kitty Courbois as (voice)
 Riek Deege as Wasvrouw
 Henk Douze as Wagenspeler
 Jan Harms as Aanrander
 Dirk Hattum as Wagenspeler
 Wil Hildebrand as Dede
 Frans Hulshof as Waard
 Carel Jansen as Wagenspeler
 Menno Jetten as Aanrander
 Leo Koenen as Kleermaker
 Johanna Leeuwenstein as Wasvrouw

Production
Cast and crew consisted of amateurs. As most of them had daytime jobs, the film was mostly shot over weekends. Ronnie Montagne, who had studied pedagogy, played Mariken. The one-eyed Moenen was played by Arielle Bailleux, a young physicist. After shooting this film they both went to the United States to complete their doctorate degrees at Stanford University, California, and never acted again.

References

External links

1974 films
1974 drama films
1970s Dutch-language films
Dutch drama films
Films directed by Jos Stelling